Jean-Paul Pinsonneault (1923–1978) was a Canadian writer who won the Prix Québec-Paris and the Governor General's Award for French-language fiction in 1964 for his novel Les terres sèches. He also published the plays Cette terre de faim, Electre and Terre d'aube, and the novels Jérôme Aquin, Le mauvais pain and Les abîmes de l'aube.

Les terres sèches was one of the first novels in Quebec history to directly address LGBT themes.

He was also the publisher of Éditions Fides, as well as a magazine editor.

References

1923 births
1978 deaths
20th-century Canadian novelists
20th-century Canadian dramatists and playwrights
Canadian male novelists
Canadian male dramatists and playwrights
Canadian novelists in French
Canadian dramatists and playwrights in French
Canadian magazine editors
Canadian book publishers (people)
Canadian gay writers
Canadian LGBT novelists
Canadian LGBT dramatists and playwrights
Writers from Quebec
French Quebecers
Governor General's Award-winning fiction writers
20th-century Canadian male writers
20th-century Canadian LGBT people
Gay dramatists and playwrights
Gay novelists